Beinn a' Chaolais (Gaelic: mountain of the sound or strait) is the lowest peak of the Paps of Jura on the island of Jura, Scotland.

It stands at 733 metres above sea level, and with over 300 metres of relative height is therefore a Graham.

References

Marilyns of Scotland
Mountains and hills of the Scottish islands
Grahams
Mountains and hills of Argyll and Bute
Paps of Jura